Lagerwey may refer to:
 , Dutch wind turbine manufacturer
  (1880–1959), bishop of Deventer
 Garth Lagerwey (born 1972), retired American soccer goalkeeper and manager
  (born 1946), American sinologist